William (Bill) S. DeSimone is a personal trainer and weight lifter. He is known for his approach to weight lifting, which focuses on correct biomechanics to build strength without undue collateral damage to connective tissue and the rest of the body.

References

 DeSimone, William S. "Moment Arm Exercise" ASIN: B000RQCU46.
 DeSimone, William S. "Congruent Exercise: How To Make Weight Training Easier on Your Joints". 2011.

External links
 YouTube Video, Bill DeSimone | Congruent Exercise | Full Length HD
 "Congruent Exercise" Facebook Page
 An Interview With Bill DeSimone

Year of birth missing (living people)
Living people
American male weightlifters
Place of birth missing (living people)